Wildwind Glacier is a substantial mountain glacier in Antarctica, 3 nautical miles (6 km) wide, which flows southward into Alatna Valley, draining both the Staten Island Heights and Mount Razorback areas, in the Convoy Range, Victoria Land. So named by a 1989-90 New Zealand Antarctic Research Program (NZARP) field party because strong and persistent winds in this vicinity have cut major flutings through the ice-cliffed terminus of the glacier. The estimated terrain elevation above sea level is 1034 metres.

References

Glaciers of Scott Coast